Luca Moro may refer to:
 Luca Moro (racing driver)
 Luca Moro (footballer)